Dyckman Street, occasionally called West 200th Street, is a street in the Inwood neighborhood of Manhattan, New York City. It is commonly considered to be a crosstown street because it runs from the Hudson River to the Harlem River and intersects Broadway. However, in its true geographical orientation, Dyckman Street runs roughly from north-northwest to south-southeast, and the majority of the street that lies southeast of Broadway runs closer to a north-south direction than east-west.

It is located where West 200th Street would be: the sequence of numbered Manhattan streets in this neighborhood has a gap between West 193rd Street and West 201st Street (with an exception for a very short West 196th Street). As a rustic 18th century valley road lying between Washington Heights and Inwood Hill, it long preceded the comprehensive Manhattan grid plan, which was not applied in this small part of the island. Dyckman Street has for many years been one of the major shopping streets in the Inwood section, and many consider it the border between Washington Heights and Inwood.

Name

Route
From its northwesternmost point at the Hudson riverbank, Dyckman Street extends southeast past the Henry Hudson Parkway. From there, it continues southeast until it intersects Broadway, where it turns in a more southward direction until it merges with Tenth Avenue to form the northernmost end of the Harlem River Drive. Traffic on Dyckman Street runs in both directions except for a one-block stretch between Broadway and Seaman Avenue, where it runs only northwest (away from Broadway).

The northwestern portion of Dyckman Street separates Inwood Hill Park (to the northeast) from Fort Tryon Park (to the southwest). Additionally, the southeastern portion of Dyckman Street borders the northern tip of Highbridge Park. Bike lanes in Dyckman Street connect the Hudson and Harlem River portions of the Manhattan Waterfront Greenway.

The seismologically active Dyckman Street Fault runs underneath the street.

Transportation
The New York City Subway's Dyckman Street station on the IND Eighth Avenue Line is located at the intersection of Dyckman Street and Broadway. The Dyckman Street station on the IRT Broadway–Seventh Avenue Line is located at the intersection of Dyckman Street and Nagle Avenue.

The Tubby Hook ferry operated from the Hudson River foot of the street to New Jersey at various times from the 18th century until 1942.

In 2018, the city government installed bike lanes along Dyckman Street, connecting the two parts of the Manhattan Waterfront Greenway. The bike lanes were removed after complaints from local business owners; after a spike in cycling deaths, the city announced plans to reinstall the bike lanes.

In popular culture
The character Pete Campbell on the series Mad Men is a descendant of the Dyckman family, and references to the area of Manhattan his family controlled are made in the show's fourth episode. It is mentioned that the Dyckman family owned a large tract of land north of what is now Central Park.

The character Charlotte Mayhew is said to have had a Dyckman Street accent in J. D. Salinger's "Raise High the Roof Beam, Carpenters."

In Migos's hit song "Versace", Drake rhymes, "Word to New York ’cause the Dyckman and Heights girls are callin' me Papi."

In Fabolous' song "I Miss My Love," Fabolous rhymes, "Met her uptown on Dyckman, aight then, light-skinned."

Dyckman Street is known for their diasporic Dominican communities.

References

Streets in Manhattan